This is a list of Protected Designation of Origin (PDO) products by country. Protected Designation of Origin is a Geographical Indication under EU and UK law. Applications can be made both for EU/UK product designation and for other territories. The EU publishes its designations in GI View.

Multiple countries
For a limited number of products, the PDO status is registered with regards to a geographical area which comprises (parts of) two countries. The are listed below:

Austria

Belgium 
In Belgium, since 2011, the Public Service of Wallonia, the Quality Department of the Operational Directorate-General for Agriculture and Natural Resources and the Environment (DGARNE), has set up CAIG; a program dedicated to geographical indication of produce. This project is carried out jointly by the University of Liège (Laboratory for Quality and Safety of Agrifood Products, Gembloux Agro-Bio Tech) and the University of Namur (Department of History, Pole of Environmental History). The objective of the CAIG is to support the Walloon producer groups wishing to submit an application for recognition of their product as a Protected Designation of Origin (PDO), Protected Geographical Indication (PGI) or Traditional Specialty Guaranteed (TSG). To do this, CAIG supports producers in their process of drafting specifications and in the work of characterizing the product.

China

Denmark

Finland

France

Germany

Greece

Ireland

Italy

Latvia

Lithuania

Luxembourg

Malta

Netherlands

Poland

Portugal

Romania

Slovakia

South Africa

Spain

Sweden

Turkey

United Kingdom

United States

Vietnam

See also
List of TSG products by country

Notes

References

Food law
Food product brands
Country of origin
Geographical indications
Products with protected designation of origin